Lovce is a village and municipality in Zlaté Moravce District of the Nitra Region, in western-central Slovakia.

History
In historical records the village was first mentioned in 1323.

Geography
The municipality lies at an altitude of 270 metres and covers an area of 10.188 km². It has a population of about 700 people.

References

External links
http://www.e-obce.sk/obec/lovce/lovce.html

Villages and municipalities in Zlaté Moravce District